The Samuel March House is a historic First Period house in West Newbury, Massachusetts.  The two-story wood-frame house was built in two sections, beginning in the later years of the 17th century.  The first portion built was the right three bays of the house, which at that time included a chimney located on the left side.  The second portion, also built during the First Period, added the two bays to the left.  At some point during the Georgian period, the large central chimney was removed and replaced with two narrow brick chimney, a reflection of changing taste.  The front facade is five bays wide, with a slightly larger central bay.  The front door is framed by a Georgian surround with pilasters and an entablature.

The house was listed on the National Register of Historic Places in 1990.

References

See also
List of the oldest buildings in Massachusetts
National Register of Historic Places listings in Essex County, Massachusetts

Houses completed in 1695
Houses in West Newbury, Massachusetts
Houses on the National Register of Historic Places in Essex County, Massachusetts
1695 establishments in Massachusetts